Tawonga is a town in northeast Victoria, Australia.

Tawonga Post Office opened on 4 October 1879.

December 5th 2011 the Country Fire Authority was alerted of a fire at the 125 year old Bogong pub. The building was destroyed.

References

Towns in Victoria (Australia)
Alpine Shire